The Episcopal Diocese of Western North Carolina is a diocese in the Episcopal Church. It consists of 28 counties in western North Carolina and its episcopal see is in Asheville, North Carolina, seated at Cathedral of All Souls. The first recorded worship from the Book of Common Prayer west of the Catawba River was in 1786. Valle Crucis, where one of the two conference centers is located, began as a missionary outpost in 1842. In 1894, a resolution was adopted in the Convention of the Diocese of North Carolina that the Western part of the state be set aside and offered to the General Church as a Missionary District. The following year, in November 1895, the first Convention of the District of Asheville was held at Trinity Church in Asheville. In 1922, after all the requirements had been fulfilled, a petition from the Jurisdiction of Asheville to become the Diocese of Western North Carolina was presented at the General Convention of The Episcopal Church. It was accepted on September 12, 1922.

The Ravenscroft Associate Missions and Training School of the North Carolina Episcopal Diocese and the former residence of the Bishop was once housed at Schoenberger Hall in Asheville.  Diocesan offices are located at the Bishop Henry Center in Asheville.

The diocese consists of 63 parishes, six summer chapels, a diocesan school (Christ School, Asheville), a retirement community (Deerfield, Asheville), two conference centers (Lake Logan and Valle Crucis), a summer camp (Camp Henry), and over 15,000 members. The diocese is divided into six deaneries. Its cathedral is the Cathedral of All Souls in Asheville, located in Biltmore Village.

The diocese is a proponent of social justice, especially in issues concerning immigration, poverty and the marginalized. The diocese is notable for having two small mountain parishes that contain frescoes created by Ben Long, an Italian-trained artist: the fresco of the Last Supper at Holy Trinity church in Glendale Springs and Mary Great with Child and John the Baptist at Saint Mary's Episcopal Church in Beaver Creek, both part of the Holy Communion Parish of Ashe County.  In another, much larger parish, St. Paul's Episcopal located in the foothills of Wilkesboro, two recent Long frescoes can be seen. These frescoes depict Paul the Apostle in prison and his conversion of the Damascan Road. They were completed in 2003.

The diocese has historically practiced a higher churchmanship than most dioceses in the Fourth Province, and particularly the other two dioceses of the state.

Bishops
 Junius Horner (1922-1933)
 Robert E. Gribbin (1934-1947)
 M. George Henry (1948-1975)
 William G. Weinhauer (1975-1990)
 Robert H. Johnson (1990-2003)
 G. Porter Taylor (2004-2016)
 José Antonio McLoughlin (2016–Present)

The 7th and current diocesan bishop is The Right Reverend José Antonio McLoughlin, who was ordained and consecrated on October 1, 2016 and is the first bishop of Western North Carolina of Hispanic descent. Prior to his election as bishop of the Diocese of Western North Carolina, Bishop José served as the canon to the ordinary and chief-of-staff for the Episcopal Diocese of Oklahoma since 2008. Previously, José served congregations in the dioceses of Southeast Florida and Virginia. Bishop José earned his Master of Divinity from Virginia Theological Seminary and Bachelor of Arts from the University of Central Florida. Prior to his call to the priesthood, the Bishop worked in the criminal justice field serving in the State of Florida as a police officer and in the U.S. Department of Justice in Washington, D.C., in various capacities, most recently as the special assistant to the assistant attorney general.  Bishop José was born in San Juan, Puerto Rico and raised in Florida.

Bishop Jose' has been married to Laurel Lynne (McFall) since 1993 and together they have two children, Alexander and Alyson.

List of parishes

Asheville Deanery
 Cathedral of All Souls, Asheville 
 Church of the Advocate 
 Grace Episcopal Church, Asheville 
 Redeemer Episcopal Church, Asheville 
 Saint George's Episcopal Church, Asheville 
 Saint James Episcopal Church, Black Mountain
 Saint John's Episcopal Church, Asheville 
 St. Luke's Episcopal Church (Asheville, North Carolina)
 St. Mary's Episcopal Church (Asheville, North Carolina)
 St. Matthias Episcopal Church, Asheville 
 Trinity Episcopal Church, Asheville 
 Episcopal Church of the Holy Spirit, Mars Hill

Foothills Deanery
 Church of the Ascension, Hickory
 Church of the Epiphany, Hickory 
 Grace Episcopal Church, Morganton
 Saint Alban's Episcopal Church, Hickory 
 Saint James Episcopal Church, Lenoir
 Saint John's Episcopal Church, Marion
 Saint Mary & Saint Stephen Episcopal Church, Morganton 
 Saint Paul's Episcopal Church, Wilkesboro
 Saint Paul's Episcopal Church, Morganton

Hendersonville Deanery
 Calvary Episcopal Church, Fletcher
 Church of the Holy Family, Mills River
 Church of the Transfiguration, Saluda
 Episcopal Church of Saint John in the Wilderness, Flat Rock
 Episcopal Church of the Holy Cross, Tryon
 Episcopal Church of the Transfiguration Bat Cave
 Good Shepherd Episcopal Church, Tryon 
 La Capilla De Santa Maria, Hendersonville
 Saint James Episcopal Church, Hendersonville 
 Saint Paul's Episcopal Church, Edneyville
 Saint Philip's Episcopal Church, Brevard

Mountain Deanery
 Christ Church, Sparta
 Church of the Holy Cross, Valle Crucis
 Church of the Resurrection, Little Switzerland
 Church of Our Savior, Newland
 Holy Communion Episcopal Parish, Ashe County, Glendale Springs and West Jefferson
 Saint Luke's Episcopal Church, Boone
 Saint Mary of the Hills Episcopal Church, Blowing Rock
 Saint Thomas Episcopal Church, Burnsville
 Trinity Episcopal Church, Spruce Pine

Piedmont Deanery
 All Saints Episcopal Church, Gastonia
 Church of the Redeemer, Shelby
 Episcopal Church of Saint Peter by the Lake, Denver
 Episcopal Church of Our Savior, Lincolnton
 Saint Andrew's Episcopal Church, Bessemer City
 Saint Francis Episcopal Church, Rutherfordton
 Saint Gabriel's Episcopal Church, Rutherfordton 
 Saint Luke's Episcopal Church, Lincolnton 
 Saint Mark's Episcopal Church, Gastonia

Western Deanery
 All Saints Episcopal Church Franklin
Church of the Good Shepherd (Cashiers, North Carolina)
 Church of the Incarnation (Highlands, North Carolina)
 Church of the Messiah, Murphy
 Episcopal Church of the Good Shepherd, Hayesville
 Grace Church in the Mountains, Waynesville
 Grace Mountainside Church, Robbinsville
 Saint Andrew's Episcopal Church, Canton
 Saint David's Episcopal Church, Cullowhee
 Saint Francis Episcopal Church, Cherokee, NC/Cullowhee
 Saint John's Episcopal Church, Sylva
 Saint John's Episcopal Church - Cartoogechaye, Franklin

References

External links
 
 Journal of the Annual Convocation, Missionary District of Asheville complete serial archive of the Dioceses predecessor organization.

Western North Carolina
Diocese of Western North Carolina
Province 4 of the Episcopal Church (United States)